Palmerton Area School District is a public school district located in Carbon County, Pennsylvania. It serves the boroughs of Palmerton and Bowmanstown,  and Lower Towamensing Township and Towamensing Township. According to 2000 federal census data, it served a resident population of 12,791. By 2010, the district's population increased to 14,056 people. The educational attainment levels for the Palmerton Area School District population (25 years old and over) were 85% high school graduates and 14% college graduates. The district is one of the 500 public school districts of Pennsylvania.

According to the Pennsylvania Budget and Policy Center, 38.9% of the district's pupils lived at 185% or below the Federal Poverty Level   as shown by their eligibility for the federal free or reduced price school meal programs in 2012. In 2013, the Pennsylvania Department of Education, reported that less than 10 students in the Palmerton Area School District were homeless. In 2009, the district residents' per capita income was $17,361, while the median family income was $42,072. In the Commonwealth, the median family income was $49,501 and the United States median family income was $49,445, in 2010.

The district operates five schools: Stephen S. Palmer Elementary School (2–6); Parkside Elementary School (K–1); Towamensing Elementary School (K–6); Palmerton Area Junior High School (7-8) and Palmerton Area High School (9-12). The junior high and senior high are in a single building. High school students may choose to attend the Carbon Career & Technical Institute for training in the construction and mechanical trades. For the 2015–16 school year, 48 resident students chose to enroll in public charter schools, rather than attend the district's schools.

The Towamensing school provided kindergarten to 4th grade until 1986. In 1986–87 school year, they were expanded to 6th grade. Before the school expanded, it only had one 1st, 2nd, 3rd, and 4th grade class.  After the expansion, those grades were doubled as well as the expansion of the two 5th and 6th grade classes.

Extracurriculars

Sports
The district's sports teams include:
Varsity

Boys
Baseball - AAA
Basketball - AAA
Cross country - A
Football - AA
Golf - AA
Soccer - AA
Tennis - AA
Track and field - AA
Wrestling - AA

Girls
Basketball - AAA
Cross country - A
Field hockey - A
Soccer - AA
Softball - AAA
Track and field - AA

Junior high school sports

Boys
Basketball
Cross country
Football
Track and field
Wrestling 

Girls
Basketball
Cross country
Field hockey 
Track and field

According to PIAA directory July 2016

References

External links
Official website

School districts in Carbon County, Pennsylvania